József Gémes (9 November 1939 – 13 April 2013) was a Hungarian animator and film director best known for directing animated films.

Selected filmography as director

References

External links 

Hungarian animators
Hungarian film directors
1939 births
2013 deaths
Hungarian male film actors
Hungarian animated film directors